John "Jackie" Copland (born 21 March 1947 in Paisley) is a Scottish former footballer who played as a centre back. Copland spent most of his career with St Mirren (in two spells), Stranraer and Dundee United, retiring from football in 1983 after his second spell with the Buddies.

Since retiring, Copland continued his association with St Mirren, working in various administrative roles.

He was inducted into the St Mirren Hall of Fame in 2016.

References 

Sources
 
 Caught in Time, Sunday Times (June 2005)

1947 births
Living people
Footballers from Paisley, Renfrewshire
Association football central defenders
Scottish footballers
St Mirren F.C. players
Stranraer F.C. players
Dundee United F.C. players
Scottish Football League players
Beith Juniors F.C. players
Scottish Football League representative players